, is a Japanese politician and former think tank researcher who served as the Minister of Justice from September 2020 to October 2021. Kamikawa previously served as Minister of State for Gender Equality and Social Affairs in the cabinets of Shinzō Abe and Yasuo Fukuda. She has been a member of the House of Representatives since December 2012.

Born in the city of Shizuoka in Shizuoka Prefecture, she graduated from the University of Tokyo in 1977. In 1988 she received a master's degree in public administration from the John F. Kennedy School of Government, Harvard University. She was elected to the House of Representatives for the first time in June 2000.

During her time in office, Kamikawa has ordered 16 executions, 13 of those executed being former members of the Aum Shinrikyo doomsday cult, whose acts of domestic terrorism included the 1995 Tokyo subway sarin attack.

References

External links 
 

|-

|-

1953 births
21st-century Japanese politicians
21st-century Japanese women politicians
Female members of the House of Representatives (Japan)
Women government ministers of Japan
Harvard Kennedy School alumni
Liberal Democratic Party (Japan) politicians
Living people
Members of the House of Representatives (Japan)
Ministers of Justice of Japan
People from Shizuoka (city)
University of Tokyo alumni
Female justice ministers